Unitas (minor planet designation: 306 Unitas) is a typical main belt asteroid that was discovered by Elia Millosevich on 1 March 1891 in Rome. The asteroid was named by the director of the Modena Observatory in honor of the Italian astronomer Angelo Secchi. It is classified as an S-type asteroid.

In the late 1990s, a network of astronomers worldwide gathered light curve data that was ultimately used to derive the spin states and shape models of 10 new asteroids, including (306) Unitas. The computed shape model for this asteroid is regular, while the light curve displays two maxima per rotation. Lightcurve data has also been recorded by observers at the Antelope Hill Observatory, which has been designated as an official observatory by the Minor Planet Center.

Measurements of the thermal inertia of 306 Unitas give an estimate range from 100 to 260 m−2 K−1 s−1/2, compared to 50 for lunar regolith and 400 for coarse sand in an atmosphere.

Although 306 Unitas has an orbit similar to the Vesta family asteroids, it was found to be an unrelated interloper on the basis of its non-matching spectral type.

References

External links 
 Lightcurve plot of (306) Unitas, Antelope Hills Observatory
 
 

000306
Discoveries by Elia Millosevich
Named minor planets
000306
000306
18910301